Namyangju United Football Club was a South Korean soccer club based in the city of Namyangju. It was a member of the Challengers League, an amateur league and the fourth tier of league football in South Korea.

2008 was its first season of participation in the Korean football league setup. The club withdraw from the league at the end of the 2012 season.

Season-by-season records

See also
 List of football clubs in South Korea

Defunct football clubs in South Korea
K3 League (2007–2019) clubs
Sport in Gyeonggi Province
Namyangju
2007 establishments in South Korea
2012 disestablishments in South Korea
Association football clubs established in 2007
Association football clubs disestablished in 2012